Aethes ardezana is a species of moth of the family Tortricidae. It is found in Switzerland, Austria, Germany, Italy, former Yugoslavia, southern France and Spain.

The wingspan is 19–21 mm. Adults have been recorded on wing in June and July.

References

Moths described in 1922
ardezana
Tortricidae of Europe